Gangachin (also Romanized as Gangachīn and Gangechīn) is a village in Beradust Rural District of Sumay-ye Beradust District of Urmia County, West Azerbaijan province, Iran. At the 2006 National Census, its population was 2,682 in 472 households. The following census in 2011 counted 2,458 people in 566 households. The latest census in 2016 showed a population of 2,488 people in 546 households; it was the largest village in its rural district.

References 

Urmia County

Populated places in West Azerbaijan Province

Populated places in Urmia County